This is a chronological, but incomplete list of Acts passed by the Imperial Legislative Council between 1861 and 1947, the Constituent Assembly of India between 1947 and 1949, The Provisional Parliament between 1949 and 1952, and the Parliament of India since 1952.

1836–1850

1851–1875

1876–1900

1901–1925

1926–1950

1951–1975

1976–2000

2001 – 2010

2011 – 2020

See also
 List of amendments of the Constitution of India
 Lawmaking procedure in India

References

External links
 Government of India's Chronological List of Acts (As of 7 June 2021)
List of Central Acts
 Law Ministry - Text of Central Acts (1851-2011)
 India Code Information System

Indian Federal Legislation

Federal Legislation